Parole is a 2022 Indian Tamil-language crime thriller film written and directed by Dwarakh Raj, who previously made Kadhal Kasakuthaiya (2016). The film features Linga, R. S. Karthiik, Kalpika Ganesh and Monisha Murali in the lead roles. The film began production during mid-2021.

Plot
Kovalan and Karikalan are brothers, Karikalan is in jail for the crimes he has committed however during his prison period their mother passes away. Whether Karikalan came out of jail in Parole for the last rites, did the divided brothers come together forms the crux of the story. It is told as an action-crime drama which is rooted in a cut-throat atmosphere. Parole also has a lot of characters who are primarily outlaws.

Cast

Soundtrack
The soundtrack was composed by first-timer Rajkumar Amal.

Reception 
A critic from The Times of India wrote that "Parole is not a great film, but definitely a very good attempt that deserves an applause for its power-packed writing".

References

External Links 

2022 films
2020s Tamil-language films
Indian gangster films